Jennifer Morse may refer to:
Jennifer Morse (mathematician), American mathematics researcher and professor
Jennifer Roback Morse (born 1953), American economist and anti-LGBT activist